Sakari Ilmanen (3 November 1880 – 16 February 1968) was a Finnish figure skater. He competed in the men's singles event at the 1920 Summer Olympics.

References

External links
 

1880 births
1968 deaths
Finnish male single skaters
Olympic figure skaters of Finland
Figure skaters at the 1920 Summer Olympics
People from Loppi
Sportspeople from Kanta-Häme